Debbarma is one of the clan of Tripuri community, predominantly in state of Tripura, India and Bangladesh who speak Kokborok, a Tibeto-Burman language.They belong to the Kshatriya Varna. In Bangladesh, they are known as 'Tripura" Tribe.

Variations
The variations of "Debbarma" consist of Debbarma, Deb Barma, DebBarma, Dev Barma, Dev Varma, Deb Burman, Dev Burman, Debbarman, Dev Barman, Dev Varman and Devvarman.

Classifications 
Although Debbarmas speak Kokborok, some differences in their accents can be found if observed carefully. The way they speak it varies in tones and words too. The accent of someone residing in the north can vary significantly if compared to someone residing in the south.

These Include: 

 Daspa
 Beri
 Dona

Groups

Notable individuals 
 Bir Bikram Kishore Debbarma (1908–1947), one of the last Kings of Tripura.
 Sachin Dev Burman, Bollywood composer and singer.
 Rahul Dev Burman, Bollywood composer and singer.
 Dasarath Debbarma, (1993-1998) first and yet only Tripuri Chief Minister of Tripura.
Jishnu Dev Varma, currently serving as a Deputy Chief Minister Of Tripura Government, and he is the youngest son of Maharaj Kumari Kamal Prabha Devi, the single sister of Maharaja Bir Bikram Kishore Manikya Debbarma (last king of Tripura).
Atul Debbarma, sitting MLA from the Krishnapur constituency. Indian doctor-turned-politician, writer, author, activist, statesman, founder of Tripur Kshatriya Samaj, Subrai Mission Trust, Subrai Vidya Mandir, Agartala. He published a Kokborok translation of the Bhagavad Gita with in-depth analysis. He translated the Rajmala (The Royal Chronicle of Tripura) and the Tripur Samhita to Kokborok.
 Sourabhee Debbarma, first female Indian idol winner, TV performer and singer.
Riya Sen Dev Varma, Bollywood actress.
 Somdev Devvarman, Indian tennis player. Somdev Devvarman created history by becoming the first Indian to win a gold medal in the men's singles tennis event of the Asian Games. In 2011, Devvarman received the Arjuna Award from the Indian government for his tennis successes. In March 2017, the Ministry of Youth Affairs and Sports, Government of India, appointed him as the national observer for tennis. In 2018, he was awarded with the civilian award Padma Shri.
Harinath Debbarma, politician, activist, statesman, author from Tripura.
Tanushree Deb Barma, the first female IAS Officer of Tripura.
Nanda Kumar Deb Barma, playwright, poet and lyricist.
Bubagra Pradyot Bikram Kishore Manikya DebBarma, TIPRA Motha, Chairman and the current head of Tripura Royal House.

See also 
 Tripura
 Kokborok language
 Tripuri people
 Twipra Kingdom
 Buisu

References 
 http://www.twipra.com/featured

Indian surnames
Scheduled Tribes of Tripura
Hindu communities